is a Japanese private university in Sendai.

Notable alumni

Politics
Shintaro Ito
Itsunori Onodera

Sports
Baseball
Mamoru Kishida
Takashi Saito
Kazuhiro Sasaki
Kazuhiro Wada
Ken Kadokura
Tomoaki Kanemoto
Figure skating
Akiko Suzuki
Golf
Hidemasa Hoshino
Hiroshi Iwata
Yūsaku Miyazato
Hideto Tanihara
Hideki Matsuyama

Visual arts
Leiji Matsumoto

Notable professors
John Stevens (scholar)

External links
 

Private universities and colleges in Japan
Buildings and structures in Sendai
Soto Zen
Universities and colleges in Miyagi Prefecture
Educational institutions established in 1875
1875 establishments in Japan